Ceratogyrus meridionalis, commonly known as the Zimbabwe grey baboon tarantula or the grey mustard baboon, is a species of tarantula. It is found in Malawi and Mozambique.

See also 
 List of Theraphosidae species

References

Theraphosidae
Spiders of Africa
Spiders described in 1907